Suchý Důl is a municipality and village in Náchod District in the Hradec Králové Region of the Czech Republic. It has about 400 inhabitants.

Administrative parts
The village of Slavný is an administrative part of Suchý Důl.

References

Villages in Náchod District